Pedro Pereira may refer to:

 Pedro Pereira (footballer, born 1978), Portuguese footballer
 Pedro Pereira (footballer, born 1984), Portuguese footballer 
 Pedro Pereira (footballer, born 1998), Portuguese footballer 
 Pedro Álvares Pereira (13??–1385), Portuguese noble
 Pedro Homem Pereira, the 17th and last Captain-major of Portuguese Ceylon 1591–1594
 Pedro Queiroz Pereira (1949–2018), Portuguese businessman and competition driver
 Pedro Teotónio Pereira (1902–1972), Portuguese politician and diplomat